Johnnie Allan (born John Allen Guillot, March 10, 1938) is an American pioneer of the swamp pop musical genre.

Career
Born in Rayne, Louisiana, United States, Allan, a Cajun, grew up in a musical family, and at age six obtained his first guitar. By age thirteen he was playing with Walter Mouton and the Scott Playboys, a traditional Cajun music band. About two years later he switched to Lawrence Walker and the Wandering Aces, another traditional Cajun band.

In 1956, he saw Elvis Presley perform live on the Louisiana Hayride music program, and shortly afterwards Allan began to play rock and roll music.  In 1958, he left Walker to form the Krazy Kats. That same year he recorded "Lonely Days, Lonely Nights" for Jin Records of Ville Platte, Louisiana. He later recorded for Mercury Records and the Viking label of Crowley, Louisiana, among others.

He returned to the Jin label in the early 1970s and went on to record many notable swamp pop tunes, including his versions of Chuck Berry's "Promised Land" and Merle Haggard's "Somewhere on Skid Row".

A perennial favorite of swamp pop fans globally, Allan has performed in Europe many times.  He is author of two music-related books, Memories: A Pictorial History of South Louisiana Music (1988) and Born to Be a Loser (1992, with Bernice Larson Webb), a biography of swamp pop musician Jimmy Donley.

A retired educator, he lives in Lafayette, Louisiana.

Discography

Albums
South to Louisiana (LP-4001 Jin Records, 1964)
A Portrait of Johnnie Allan (LP 9012 Jin Records, 1976)
Cajun Country (9022 Jin Records, 1980)
Good Timin' Man (FLY LP 551 Flyright, 1980)
Promised Land (810 598-1 Polydor, 1983) (200.001 VIP, 1983)
South to Louisiana (CH 145 Ace Records, 1985)
Sings Cajun Now  (LP-6069 Swallow, 1987)

References

Bibliography
 John Broven, South to Louisiana: Music of the Cajun Bayous (Gretna, Louisiana: Pelican Press, 1983). 
 Shane K. Bernard, Swamp Pop: Cajun and Creole Rhythm and Blues (Jackson: University Press of Mississippi, 1996). 

1938 births
Living people
People from Rayne, Louisiana
American male singer-songwriters
American male pop singers
American rock musicians
American rock singers
American rock songwriters
Writers from Louisiana
Mercury Records artists
Swamp pop music
Singer-songwriters from Louisiana
Cajun musicians